Autoroute 19 may refer to:
 A19 autoroute, in France 
 Quebec Autoroute 19, in Quebec, Canada

See also 
 List of A19 roads
 List of highways numbered 19